Corozzo is a surname. Notable people with the surname include:

Joseph Corozzo (born 1942), American mobster
Nicholas Corozzo (born 1940), American mobster, brother of Joseph